Northamptonshire County Council was the county council for Northamptonshire in England. It was initially created in 1889 under the Local Government Act 1888, with its functions being substantially reformed in 1974 under the Local Government Act 1972. The council was abolished in 2021, with the area split into North Northamptonshire and West Northamptonshire. Elections to Northamptonshire County Council were held every four years.

Political control

Leadership
The leaders of the council from 2005 until the council's abolition in 2021 were:

Council elections
2001 Northamptonshire County Council election (boundary changes increased the number of seats by 5)
2005 Northamptonshire County Council election
2009 Northamptonshire County Council election
2013 Northamptonshire County Council election
2017 Northamptonshire County Council election

County result maps

By-election results

1993–1997

2001–2005

2005–2009

2009–2013

2013–2017

References

External links

 

 
Council elections in Northamptonshire
County council elections in England